The  was a bayonet designed for the Imperial Japanese Army to be used with the Arisaka Type 30 Rifle and was later used on the Type 38 and Type 99 rifles, Types 96 and 99 light machine guns, and the Type 100 submachine gun. Some 8.4 million were produced, and it remained in front-line use from the Russo-Japanese War to the end of World War II. All Japanese infantrymen were issued with the Type 30, whether they were armed with a rifle or pistol, or even if they were unarmed. Because of its reliability, it was a valuable tool for the Japanese army.

Description

The Type 30 bayonet is also known as the "Pattern 1897 bayonet". Early Type 30 bayonets usually sported a J-shaped hooked quillon guard designed to catch and trap the enemy's blade. By 1942 the quillon was eliminated to save materials and decrease production time, leaving only a straight guard. Type 30 scabbards went from metal (pre-1942) to vulcanized fiber (1942-43), and finally to wood or bamboo (1944-45). Scabbards were usually painted black and called a burdock sword (gobo ken) as it looked like burdock, a vegetable.

The design was intended to give the average Japanese infantryman a long enough reach to pierce the abdomen of a cavalryman.  However, the structure had a number of drawbacks, some caused by the poor quality of forgings used, which tended to rust quickly and not hold an edge, and break when bent.

The weapon was manufactured from 1897 to 1945 at a number of locations, including the Kokura Arsenal, Koishikawa Arsenal (Tokyo), and Nagoya Arsenal, as well as under contract by private manufacturers including Matsushita, and Toyoda Automatic Loom.

References

External links
Japanese Type 30 Bayonet

Bayonets
World War II infantry weapons of Japan